Kilroot power station is a coal and oil power station on the north shore of Belfast Lough at Kilroot near Carrickfergus in County Antrim, Northern Ireland. The station generates 560 megawatts (MW) of electricity from dual coal and oil fuelled generators, along with approximately 141 megawatts (MW) from four Gas Turbines and 10 MW of battery energy storage from the Kilroot Advancion Energy Storage Array.

Since the privatisation of Northern Ireland Electricity in 1992, the power station has been owned by the AES Corporation. In 2019 it was sold to a subsidiary of Energetický a průmyslový holding.

It is the only coal-fired power station operating in Northern Ireland, and once produced a third of the country's electricity. It is also one of County Antrim's top 100 employers.

History
Kilroot power station was designed and built by Kennedy and Donkin, consultants for Northern Ireland Electricity (NIE), commencing in 1974. The Cleveland Bridge Company also worked on the construction of the station. The station was originally designed to use four 300 megawatt (MW) generating units. Due to government spending restrictions in the early 1980s the project was truncated to two units. The station opened on 1 February 1981, when the first of the two generating unit went into operation. The plant was completed in 1982. The power station was originally fuelled by only oil, as it was the lowest cost fuel at the time. But following a change in generating policies in Northern Ireland in 1985 following the increase in oil prices, it was decided the plant would be converted to burn coal as well as oil. This conversion took place between 1986 and 1989, and the power station has burned almost exclusively only coal ever since.

The AES Corporation took over the station in a 50/50 partnership with Tractebel of Belgium in 1992 when NIE was privatised and sold its four power stations in Northern Ireland. Tractebel later sold their holding so that today Kilroot is solely run by AES.

In December 2005, AES was granted permission to install flue gas desulfurization (FGD) equipment at the station. This was to help the station meet the EU Large Combustion Plant Directive by January 2008.

Kilroot Power Limited opted into the Transitional National Plan of the Industrial Emissions Directive from 1 January 2016 to 30 June 2020. The Transitional National Plan allows the plant to pollute at a higher rate that would otherwise be permitted by EU rules as long as overall emissions for all participating plants are reduced each year.

In January 2018, Kilroot's failure to win a new contract under the Single Electricity Market threatened its closure by May. However, the plant owner AES had to apply to the Utility Regulator for a derogation to allow it to shut the plant, which has not been granted. Ballylumford was also affected, with the B station likely to close with the potential loss of 30 jobs.

In April 2019 AES Corporation has agreed to sell Kilroot to EP UK Investments, a subsidiary of Energetický a průmyslový holding. The transaction was finalized in June 2019.

Conversion to gas power
In May 2020, the plant won a power auction to supply electricity from gas power from 2023/2024. The coal plant will close.

Specification
The main boilers were designed and built by Clarke Chapman. The station's turbo generators was designed and built by GEC. Each of the station's two units can dual-fire coal and oil, and have the capacity to produce 280 MW of electricity when burning oil.

Operation

Coal is delivered to the jetty at Kilroot by small colliers typically capable of carrying 8,000 tonnes of coal. This is transferred by the collier's unloader onto Kilroot's conveyor, which transports the coal to the junction tower. From the junction tower the coal can be transported to the bunkers for immediate use or stored for later use. The Central Stacker Reclaimer (CSR) distributes the stored coal around itself ready to be reclaimed when the coal is required.

The coal in the bunker is transported to the mills via further conveyors, where the coal is pulverised into a gritty powder. The coal is then mixed with hot air as it is conveyed to the boiler for combustion, coal enters the boiler at several heights in the boiler and at the 4 corners. These coal feeders are positioned in order to maximise the efficient burning of the fuel. The coal is heated before entering the boiler to reduce the moisture content of the coal and increase efficiency.

The electricity is generated at 17 kilovolts (kV) and raised via transformers to 275 kV for transmission on the Northern Ireland electricity distribution grid.

Oil has been imported at the jetty at Kilroot since a modification in 2009 and stored in 2 large storage tanks located adjacent to the main Carrickfergus Larne Road.

References

Oil-fired power stations in Northern Ireland
Buildings and structures in County Antrim
Coal-fired power stations in Northern Ireland
Energy infrastructure completed in 1981
1981 establishments in the United Kingdom
Energetický a průmyslový holding